Ukraine competed at the 2017 Winter Universiade in Almaty, Kazakhstan. 62 Ukrainian athletes competed in 10 sports out of 12 except for curling and ice hockey.

Medalists

Competitors

Alpine skiing

Biathlon

Men

Women

Mixed

Figure skating

See also
 Ukraine at the 2017 Summer Universiade

References

2017 Winter Universiade
Ukraine at the Winter Universiade
Winter Universiade
Nations at the 2017 Winter Universiade